The following is a list of natives, residents and former residents of Shaker Heights, Ohio.

A
Danesha Adams, soccer player
Griff Allen, auto racing promoter, broadcaster, engineer
Erick Anderson, football linebacker
Albert Ayler, jazz saxophonist

B
Jamie Babbit, director, producer, and screenwriter

Newton D. Baker, politician
Bill Balas, screenwriter, director, producer
William Bayer, crime fiction writer
Carter Bays, television writer, creator of How I Met Your Mother
David Mark Berger, weightlifter, one of 11 Israeli athletes murdered by Arab commandos at the 1972 Munich Olympic Games
Peter Bergman, member of The Firesign Theatre
Wrestlers The Beverly Brothers (Mike Enos and Wayne Bloom) were billed as hailing from Shaker Heights
Leon Bibb, television anchor
Keith Black, neurosurgeon
John Blackburn, songwriter
Sara J. Bloomfield, Executive Director of the United States Holocaust Memorial Museum
Roberts Blossom, actor and poet
Andy Borowitz, comedian and satirist
Eric Brakey, politician and Maine State Senator
Jim Brickman, musician
Aris Brimanis, ice hockey defenseman
Paul Brown, football coach and owner
Dick Brubaker, football player for the Chicago Cardinals and Buffalo Bills
Judith Butler, gender theorist and philosopher

C
Jane L. Campbell, politician; 56th Mayor of Cleveland
James Card, film preservationist
Martha Chase, geneticist
Adrien Clarke, Virginia Destroyers offensive lineman
Ward Cleaver, fictional character in Leave It to Beaver
Nate Clements, Cincinnati Bengals cornerback
Wat T. Cluverius, diplomat
Anne Cochran, singer
Gary Cohn, President and COO of Goldman Sachs, economic advisor to the Trump Administration
Jim Cohn, poet
Bruce Cole, former chairman of the National Endowment for the Humanities
Constance Cook, Republican Party politician

D
Rebecca Dallet, Wisconsin Supreme Court justice
Marc Dann, former Ohio Attorney General
William Daroff, director of the Washington, D.C. office of the Jewish Federations of North America
Arthur Carter Denison, federal judge
Cheri Dennis, the Princess of Bad Boy Entertainment
Derf Backderf, John Backderf, cartoonist
Samuel Deutsch, jeweler and sports franchise owner
Maximilian Dimoff, principal bassist of the Cleveland Orchestra
Christoph von Dohnányi, conductor

E
Eric Ehrmann, author and columnist
Harry Eisenstat, baseball pitcher
James Emery, jazz guitarist

F
Michelle Federer, theatre and film actress
Danny Ferry, former NBA player; former General Manager of the Cleveland Cavaliers
Bobby Few, jazz pianist
Eric Fingerhut, politician and academic administrator
Craig Finn, singer and guitarist
Nate Fish, American-Israeli writer, baseball player/coach
Lee Fisher, former Lieutenant Governor of Ohio
James Frey, author
Devin Friedman, journalist
Marcia Fudge, congresswoman

G
Zelma Watson George, actress, philanthropist
Jeff Gerth, journalist
Nicole Gibbs, tennis player
Anand Giridharadas, writer and newspaper columnist
Samuel Glazer, co-developer of Mr. Coffee 
Maurice Goldman, composer
Stuart Goldman, journalist, screenwriter, musician
Derrick Green, musician, singer of the band Sepultura and Maximum Hedrum
Richard J. Green, chemist
Tom Griswold, co-host of The Bob & Tom Show
Robert Lee Grossman, computer scientist and bioinformatician
Matt Guerrier, baseball player

H
Jamey Haddad, percussionist
Dorothy Hart, actress
Jerry Heller, rap manager
Caroline Hoxby, economist

I
David Icove, former FBI Academy Instructor

J
Paul Jones, judge
Peter Lawson Jones, Cuyahoga County commissioner

K
Paul Kantor, violin teacher
Kid Cudi, born Scott Mescudi, rapper
Donald James Kirk, accountant
Freddie Kitchens, NFL head coach
Archibald Klumph, founder of the Rotary Foundation
Andrew Kober, stage actor
Ralph Kohl, football player, coach and scout
Ralph Kovel, antiques writer

L
Jaime Laredo, violinist
Al Lerner, late owner of the Cleveland Browns and former chairman of MBNA
Michael Lesy, writer and professor
Eddie Levert, lead singer of The O'Jays
Gerald Levert, musician
Sean Levert, musician
Mark F. Lindsay, Assistant to the President of the United States for Management and Administration under Bill Clinton
Tommy LiPuma, music producer
Wesley Lowery, The Washington Post journalist
Matthew Luckiesh, physicist

M
Lorin Maazel, conductor
Machine Gun Kelly, born Richard Colson Baker, rapper
Kevin Mackey, college basketball coach
Gordon Macklin, businessman
Wade Manning, NFL wide receiver
Bill Mason, jewel thief
Lance Mason, politician
Michael McElroy, actor
Marc Mencher, video game industry executive
Howard Metzenbaum, U.S. senator
Aaron David Miller, American Middle East analyst, author, and negotiator
Creighton Miller, attorney who helped organize the National Football League Players Association
Thomas Modly, former United States Secretary of the Navy
Justin Morrow, MLS soccer player
Ted Mosby, fictional character in How I Met Your Mother
Otis Moss III, pastor of Chicago's Trinity United Church of Christ
Felice Mueller, rower

N
Paul Newman, actor and auto racer
Billy Newton-Davis, R&B, jazz and gospel singer-songwriter
Celeste Ng, writer

O
Susan Orlean, journalist
Peter Ostrum, actor

P
Paula Jai Parker, actress
Harvey Pekar, comic book writer
Roger Penske, race car driver, team owner, and business entrepreneur
Kenneth Perko, knot theorist
David Pogue, technology writer, journalist and commentator
James Alan Polster, novelist, movie producer and journalist
Dan A. Polster, judge
Greg Pruitt, football running back

R
Joshua Radin, singer-songwriter
Bruce Ratner, philanthropist and real estate developer; on the board of directors for Forest City Enterprises 
Mark Ratner, chemist
Michael Ratner, attorney and human rights activist
Laurel J. Richie, current president of the Women's National Basketball Association
Geraldo Rivera, attorney and talk show host
Sharon Robinson, cellist
Michael Roizen, physician
Chris Rose, host of The Best Damn Sports Show Period
Terry Rozier, basketball player
Michael Ruhlman, writer
Campy Russell, basketball player
John Morris Russell, conductor

S
Marlene Sanders, journalist
Scott Savol, American Idol finalist
Leonard Sax, MD/PhD, physician and author
Michael Scharf, law professor and director of Frederick K. Cox International Law Center
Alan Schechter, film producer
Kathryn Schulz, journalist and writer
Molly Shannon, comedian
Maria Siemionow, surgeon at the Cleveland Clinic
Charlie Sifford,  African American former professional golfer who helped to desegregate the PGA of America
Rabbi Abba Hillel Silver, rabbi, Zionist spokesman and leader
Marisa Silver, author, screenplay writer, and director
Ben Simon, NHL ice hockey center
Jamil Smith, print and television journalist
Charles E. Spahr, Sohio President and CEO
David Spero, DJ, music manager
Stephen Stucker, actor
Bob Switzer, inventor
Michael Symon, Iron Chef, restaurateur, and television host
George Szell, former conductor of the Cleveland Orchestra

T
Bill Taft, rock musician
Kingsley A. Taft, politician
Milan Tiff, Olympic triple jumper

U
Loung Ung, Cambodian American human rights activist and author

V
William R. Van Aken, politician
Van Sweringen brothers, real estate developers of Shaker Heights and railroad tycoons
Ralph Vince, football player and coach
Daniel Vovak, political comedian and author
Vronsky & Babin, duo-piano team

W
David Wain, actor, filmmaker and comedian
Clay Weiner, director
Dr. Robert J. White, neurosurgeon
Shereé Whitfield, from The Real Housewives of Atlanta
Kym Whitley, comedian and actress
Fred Willard, comedian
Milton A. Wolf, real estate developer and U.S. Ambassador
Sidney M. Wolfe, drug safety activist

Z
Jack Zwerner, professional poker player and entrepreneur

See also

List of people from Cleveland
List of people from Ohio

References

 
Shaker Heights, Ohio
Shaker Heights, Ohio
Shaker Heights, Ohio